Mozzi may refer to:

People
 Alessandro Mapelli-Mozzi (born 1951), British-Italian alpine skier
 Edoardo Mapelli Mozzi (born 1983), British-Italian property developer and husband of Princess Beatrice, a granddaughter of Queen Elizabeth II.
 Andrea dei Mozzi (died 1296), Italian bishop
 Luigi Mozzi (1746–1813), Italian Jesuit controversialist
 Mozzi Gyorio (born 1989), Canadian soccer player

Places
 Biblioteca Comunale Mozzi Borgetti, public library of Macerata, Italy
 Palazzo Mozzi, an early Renaissance palace in Florence, Italy
 Villa Mapolli-Mozzi, located in Ponte San Pietro, Italy

See also
 Mosquito
 Mossi (disambiguation)
 Mozzie (disambiguation)